Putative quinone oxidoreductase is an enzyme that in humans is encoded by the TP53I3 gene.

The protein encoded by this gene is similar to oxidoreductases, which are enzymes involved in cellular responses to oxidative stresses and irradiation. This gene is induced by the tumor suppressor p53 and is thought to be involved in p53-mediated cell death. It contains a p53 consensus binding site in its promoter region and a downstream pentanucleotide microsatellite sequence. P53 has been shown to transcriptionally activate this gene by interacting with the downstream pentanucleotide microsatellite sequence. The microsatellite is polymorphic, with a varying number of pentanucleotide repeats directly correlated with the extent of transcriptional activation by p53. It has been suggested that the microsatellite polymorphism may be associated with differential susceptibility to cancer. At least two transcript variants encoding the same protein have been found for this gene.

References

Further reading